Corton Denham is a village and parish in Somerset, England, situated seven miles north east of Yeovil in the South Somerset district.  The village has a population of 189.

History

The village was named Corfetone in the Domesday Book of 1086, coming from the Old English meaning the settlement in a cutting. The second part of the name comes from the Dynham (later Dynham) family who held the manor from the 12th century until 1509.

The parish was part of the hundred of Horethorne.

In the 19th century an iron waterwheel was installed at Whitcombe Farmhouse.

The village was on the covers of two 2006 calendars.

Governance

The parish council has responsibility for local issues, including setting an annual precept (local rate) to cover the council's operating costs and producing annual accounts for public scrutiny. The parish council evaluates local planning applications and works with the local police, district council officers, and neighbourhood watch groups on matters of crime, security, and traffic. The parish council's role also includes initiating projects for the maintenance and repair of parish facilities, as well as consulting with the district council on the maintenance, repair, and improvement of highways, drainage, footpaths, public transport, and street cleaning. Conservation matters (including trees and listed buildings) and environmental issues are also the responsibility of the council.

The village falls within the Non-metropolitan district of South Somerset, which was formed on 1 April 1974 under the Local Government Act 1972, having previously been part of Wincanton Rural District. The district council is responsible for local planning and building control, local roads, council housing, environmental health, markets and fairs, refuse collection and recycling, cemeteries and crematoria, leisure services, parks, and tourism.

Somerset County Council is responsible for running the largest and most expensive local services such as education, social services, libraries, main roads, public transport, policing and fire services, trading standards, waste disposal and strategic planning.

It is also part of the Yeovil county constituency represented in the House of Commons of the Parliament of the United Kingdom. It elects one Member of Parliament (MP) by the first past the post system of election, and was part of the South West England constituency of the European Parliament prior to Britain leaving the European Union in January 2020, which elected seven MEPs using the d'Hondt method of party-list proportional representation.

Religious sites

The parish Church of St Andrew was rebuilt 1869–1870 to a design of Charles Barker-Green for the Rev W.B Portman and the patron Lord Portman of Orchard Portman.

Notable residents

Former Blue Peter presenter Valerie Singleton lived in the village.

World War 2 recipient of the Victoria Cross for bravery, Rear Admiral Godfrey Place, is buried in the village. He was awarded the VC when, as a former mini sub-mariner he took part in a successful and very difficult  attack which  severely damaged the German battleship Tirpitz  in 1943.   

https://en.wikipedia.org/wiki/Godfrey_Place

References.

External links

Villages in South Somerset
Civil parishes in Somerset